The 1967–68 Segunda División season was the 37th since its establishment and was played between 10 September 1967 and 28 April 1968.

Overview before the season
32 teams joined the league, including 3 relegated from the 1966–67 La Liga and 4 promoted from the 1966–67 Tercera División.

Relegated from La Liga
Granada
Hércules
Deportivo La Coruña

Promoted from Tercera División
Alcoyano
Jaén
Xerez
Badajoz

Group North

Teams

League table

Top goalscorers

Top goalkeepers

Results

Group South

Teams

League table

Top goalscorers

Top goalkeepers

Results

Promotion playoffs

First leg

Second leg

Relegation playoffs

First leg

Second leg

Tiebreaker

External links
BDFútbol

Segunda División seasons
2
Spain